David A. Forsyth is a South-African-born American computer scientist and the Fulton Watson Copp Chair in Computer Science the University of Illinois at Urbana–Champaign.

Education
Forsyth holds Bachelor of Science (1984) and Master of Science (1986) degrees in Electrical Engineering from the University of the Witwatersrand, Johannesburg. He was awarded a Doctor of Philosophy degree from the University of Oxford for research supervisor J. Michael Brady in 1989.

Career and research
Forsyth stayed at Oxford as a postdoc ("Fellow by Examination") until 1991. Then he moved to the University of Iowa, and in 1994 he moved to the University of California, Berkeley, where he became a full professor before moving to the University of Illinois at Urbana–Champaign in 2004. He co-authored with UIUC CS Professor Jean Ponce, in 2002, "Computer Vision: A Modern Approach", one of the leading publications addressing the topic. He has published over 100 papers on computer vision, computer graphics and machine learning. He served as program co-chair for IEEE Computer Vision and Pattern Recognition in 2000, general co-chair for IEEE CVPR 2006, program co-chair for ECCV 2008, program co-chair for IEEE CVPR 2011, general co-chair for IEEE CVPR 2015, and is a regular member of the program committee of all major international conferences on computer vision. He served on the NRC Committee on "Protecting Kids from Pornography and other Inappropriate Material on the Internet", which sat for three years and produced a study widely praised for its sensible content. He has received best paper awards at the International Conference on Computer Vision and at the European Conference on Computer Vision.

Forsyth's research interest also includes graphics and machine learning; he served as a committee member of ICML 2008.

Awards and honors
In 2013, he was elected a Fellow of the Association for Computing Machinery.

References

People from Cape Town
Living people
American computer scientists
Year of birth missing (living people)
University of Illinois Urbana-Champaign faculty
Fellows of the Association for Computing Machinery